The Super50 Cup, currently named the CG Insurance Super50 Cup for sponsorship purposes is the domestic one-day cricket competition in the West Indies. It was previously known as the KFC Cup until the fast food chain pulled out of sponsorship in 2008 and the WICB Cup until 2011. Afterwards it was known the Regional Super50 until 2014 when NAGICO Insurance became the title sponsor and it became the NAGICO Regional Super50 until 2021. In recent years it has been run in a condensed format with the group stage taking place over approximately two to three weeks, immediately followed by the knock-out stages. Trinidad and Tobago have won the most titles – 12, including one shared).

Competing teams 
Twenty-five teams have participated in at least one edition of the competition, with Barbados, Guyana, Jamaica, and Trinidad and Tobago the only teams to have participated in every edition. The Leeward Islands and Windward Islands have competed in every tournament except for four and three tournaments respectively when they were variously divided into other teams such as Antigua and Barbuda, Saint Vincent and the Grenadines, Rest of the Leeward Islands, Rest of the Windward Islands or Northern Windward Islands and Southern Windward Islands.

Current teams (2022–23)

 
 
 
 

 
 
  Combined Campuses
  West Indies Emerging Team (previously West Indies B)

Former teams (number of seasons)

  (3)
  (5)
  (9)
  (1)
  Hampshire County Cricket Club (1)
  (1)
  Kent County Cricket Club (2)
  (1)

  (1)
  (3)
  ICC Americas (2)
  (6)
  (1)
  (1)
 
  University of the West Indies (2)
  West Indies High Performance Centre (2)

History 

The first official senior limited overs game in the West Indies was played on 18 March 1970, between a touring Duke of Norfolk's XI and the Barbados team. Three years later, a trial knock-out tournament named the Banks Trophy—which has been given List A status—was arranged between Barbados, Guyana, Jamaica and Trinidad and Tobago, and Barbados beat Guyana in the final by nine runs.

Then, there were no more official one-day competitions until February 1976, when the first official one-day tournament named the Gillette Cup was held between the four teams making up the Banks Trophy, along with the Leeward Islands and the Windward Islands. The Gillette Cup had two groups of three teams, each team playing each other once, and with the winners progressing to the final. Barbados and Trinidad and Tobago—also the teams who shared the 1975–76 Carib Beer Cup—won their groups and played off in the final at Kensington Oval, and Barbados won the first final by 43 runs. Those two teams also faced off in the next season's final, and once again Barbados prevailed.

The next season, the tournament was renamed the Geddes Grant/Harrison Line Trophy, named after two large shipping companies in the area, with Leeward Islands and Jamaica progressing from the two groups. However, the final, scheduled to be held at the Antigua Recreation Ground on 8 April 1977, was rained off, and the teams shared the trophy. A shared trophy has happened twice more in the history of the tournament. Three more teams became winners in the next four seasons, before Jamaica began a row of finals appearances, starting with qualifying for the 1982–83 final. They then turned up in six successive finals from 1983 to 1988, winning three of them to pass Barbados on the all-time winners list.

In 1988–89 the tournament was renamed to the Geddes Grant Shield, and with that, Jamaica's run of finals appearances was ended, as they were knocked out by Windward Islands on run rate per wicket lost. The Windward Islands went on to the final with Guyana, and after being set 155 to win, they lost their first three wickets for five runs. Opener Darwin Telemaque then put on 43 with captain Julian Charles before retiring hurt, and two wickets from Guyana captain Roger Harper sent the Windwards to 85 for 6. Needing 70, and with only three men left, Telemaque returned – only to have two of his partners run out, and the Windwards were 99 for 8. Telemaque stuck in, however, adding 39 with Ian Allen, before number 11 Dominique Lewis came in to bat in his List A debut with 17 needed. It came down to the last over, and the Windwards managed to take the winning runs, becoming one-wicket victors.

The next tournaments were not as close, although Jamaica's win in 1990–91—their fourth in eight seasons, and their last for a further eight—also came down to the last over, but then with four wickets in hand. Then, in 1992–93 the era of the Leeward Islands began. They won three successive titles—admittedly with the first one rained off, but the next two won outright—before fading back to last place in their three-team group in 1995–96, beaten by the two teams who would later try to contest the final, but had to share the trophy due to rain. The tournament was also renamed in 1994–95, becoming the Shell/Sandals Trophy.

The next season saw two new teams for the first time, as Bermuda and Canada joined, but both finished bottom of their groups with neither managing to win any of their six games. Trinidad and Tobago won the tournament, and also reached the semi-finals of the next season's tournament, which was named the Red Stripe Bowl after the beer brand Red Stripe. The tournament was won by the Leeward Islands, the last of their five titles as of 2005, while Bermuda and Canada once again went winless.

By the end of the 1990s, the tournament had been established as an early-season feature, with the semi-finals and finals being held in Jamaica and the first class matches in the Busta Cup (now Carib Beer Cup) coming after the Red Stripe Bowl had been completed. In the last of these opening-season tournaments in the 20th century Jamaica won after beating Leeward Islands in the final, also their fifth and last victory to date. 2000–01 saw two more teams invited, and the first match win by one of the non-first class teams against a first class teams – the United States beat Barbados by two wickets, but it didn't prevent them from coming last in the group. The Windward Islands won, their second and last title to date, after beating the Leeward Islands in the final. The 2001–02 season saw all four non-first class teams excluded, and instead the Island teams were split—Leeward Islands were divided into Antigua and Barbuda and the Rest, while the Windward Islands were divided into a North and a South group. All four teams finished in third or fourth place of their respective four-team groups, as Guyana won the title.

The next season saw even more changes. The North and South approach for the Windwards was scrapped, and it was instead split into a team for Saint Vincent and the Grenadines and another for the Rest of the Windward Islands (who finished last), a University of the West Indies team was introduced, and Canada returned. Neither team succeeded in the finals, though Canada could have reached the semi-final with a win over Trinidad and Tobago—however, they were bowled out for 55 in a 175-run defeat to finish third in the group. Trinidad and Tobago was then knocked out at the semi-final stage, while Barbados went on to win. The next season saw St Vincent compete with the Windward Islands again, while the West Indies Under-19 team replaced them—they finished fourth in their five-team group, and once again the four nation teams qualified for the final, with Guyana beating Barbados.

The 2004–05 tournament saw a change to a format that's held for the last two seasons. The tournament—named the Regional One-Day Tournament for lack of a sponsor—was now held in Guyana and Barbados instead of Jamaica, and the traditional six teams competed, with Guyana reaching the final but falling to Trinidad and Tobago. The next season saw a change of name to the current, the KFC Cup, and Guyana won on the Duckworth-Lewis method after the umpires stopped the game after the 49th over with two runs to get. The Guyanese team had been offered the light earlier, but not realising they were ahead on Duckworth-Lewis, they chose to bat on, and it was enough to win the game.

In December 2013, NAGICO Insurance was announced as the new title sponsor of the Regional Super50. The winning team will take home the Clive Lloyd Trophy – named in honour of the legendary former West Indies captain. The 2014 event will feature eight teams – Barbados, Combined Campuses & Colleges, Guyana, Jamaica, Leeward Islands, Trinidad & Tobago, Windward Islands and Ireland. The tournament will be televised live throughout the Caribbean on ESPN. Matches will be played from January 30 to February 16 in Trinidad and Tobago and there will be day/night fixtures.

In 2014, the WICB approved major changes to the regional domestic cricket structure, including extending the first-class season, fully professionalizing the first-class and list A game with six territorial boards contracting 15 players each for the extended season and an extending the regional 50-over competition to provide players with more opportunities to get experience, accumulate runs and wickets so they can stake a claim for a spot in the regional side.

Current structure 

The NAGICO Regional Super50 of 2013–14 had an initial twelve-day preliminary round with two zones (A and B) of four teams each. Within each zone the teams played a round-robin format, where each team played three fixtures. The top two teams from each group then progressed to the semi-finals, with number one in zone A playing number two from Zone B and number two from Zone A playing number one from zone B, and the winners of the semi-finals faced off in the final for the trophy. All matches were played in Trinidad & Tobago.

Points awarded at the round robin stage:

 4 points for a win
 2 points for a tie
 0 points for a loss
 1 bonus point for wins where the net run rate of the winner was 1.25 times that of the opposition. A team's run rate will be calculated by reference to the runs scored in an innings divided by the number of overs faced.

Winners

Number of wins by team (since 1972–73)

Most successful captains

References

External links
 Cricinfo
 CaribbeanCricket.com
 CricketArchive

 
West Indian domestic cricket competitions
Recurring sporting events established in 1973
Sports leagues established in 1973
List A cricket competitions